Choi Eun-yeong (최은영) may refer to:
 Choi Eun-young (born 1984), South Korean novelist
 Choi Eun-young (field hockey) (born 1985), South Korean field hockey player
 Eunyoung Choi, South Korean animator